Tamakiyama Masanori (born April 29, 1951 as Masanori Hagio) is a former sumo wrestler from Maebaru, Fukuoka, Japan. He reached the rank of komusubi in July 1979 and retired in March 1984.

Career record

See also
Glossary of sumo terms
List of past sumo wrestlers
List of komusubi

References

1951 births
Living people
Japanese sumo wrestlers
Sumo people from Fukuoka Prefecture
Komusubi